Anbukku Naan Adimai is a 1980 Indian Tamil language action drama film directed by R. Thyagarajan and produced under the Devar Films banner by C. Dhandayuthapani. It stars Rajinikanth, Vijayan, Surulirajan, Thengai Srinivasan, Asokan, Sundarrajan, Sujatha, Rathi, Ramaprabha and Jayamalini. The film was simultaneously made in Telugu as Mayadari Krishnudu, with Sreedhar replacing Vijayan and a slightly different supporting cast that included Satyanarayana, Mohan Babu, and Allu Rama Lingaiah. It was remade in Hindi as Thanedaar.

Plot 

Vijayan (Sreedhar in Telugu), the Inspector and Rajini a thief, are brothers who get separated in childhood. When they meet in a strange situation, Vijayan is thrown out of the train and Rajini lands in the village as the inspector and the events following is the story. Rathi who performs a dance in the street helps Rajini and steals his heart.

Cast

Tamil version 

Rajinikanth as Gopinath
Vijayan as Gopinath's brother
Sujatha as Lakshmi
Rathi as Gowri
Surulirajan as C.I.D. Kandhasamy
Thengai Srinivasan as Head Constable
A. Karunanidhi as Head Constable
'Karate' R. V. T. Mani as Nagappan
S. A. Ashokan as D.C.P.
Nagesh as Sekhar (Guest appearance)
Major Sundarrajan as Sundar
Prabhakar as Velu
Ramaprabha as Gowri's sister
Jayamalini
V. Gopalakrishnan
Master Haja Sheriff as Child Gopinath
Usilai Mani as Police constable

Telugu version 
The characters played by Sujatha, Rathi, and Jayamalini were retained for the Telugu version. The character Gopinath is renamed Krishna in the Telugu version.

 Rajinikanth as Krishna
 Sreedhar as Krishna's elder brother
 Satyanarayana as Sarva Rayudu
 Mohan Babu
 Allu Rama Lingaiah
 Rama Prabha
 K. V. Chalam
 K. K. Sharma
 Babji

Soundtrack 
The music was composed by Ilaiyaraaja.
 Tamil Track List

Reception 
Kanthan of Kalki praised Sujatha's performance, but felt Vijayan was underutilised.

References

External links 
 

1980 films
1980 multilingual films
1980s action drama films
1980s masala films
1980s Tamil-language films
1980s Telugu-language films
Films directed by R. Thyagarajan (director)
Films scored by Ilaiyaraaja
Indian action drama films
Indian multilingual films
Tamil films remade in other languages
Telugu films remade in other languages